North Dakota Highway 15 (ND 15) is a  east–west state highway in central North Dakota. The western terminus is at U.S. Route 52 (US 52) in Fessenden and the eastern terminus is at Interstate 29 (I-29) and US 81 near Thompson. ND 15 was designated in 1939.

Route description
After the concurrency ends, ND 15 heads east for  before leaving Wells County and entering Eddy County. The concurrency heads north for  before ND 20 forks north and ND 15 forks east.  farther east, the route enters Nelson County.  east of the county line, ND 15 reaches the community of Pekin. East of Pekin, the highway intersects ND 1.

ND 15 is one of the less traveled highways in North Dakota, with average traffic in 2011 at about 200-600 vehicles per day with about 1000-2500 vehicles per day during its concurrency with US 281 and in Grand Forks County.

History
ND 15 was designated in 1939.  Since then, its routing has largely remained the same, but it has undergone some changes.  Southeast of New Rockford, the route originally turned north and then west to enter New Rockford from the west.  It has since been straightened to intersect US 281 south of town.  Between just east of Pekin and the south side of Northwood, the highway stair-stepped along through Nelson and Grand Forks counties.  To reduce the number of turns, the stair-stepping portion of the highway was straightened into a diagonal and a new alignment was built that passed to the north of Northwood.  At Thompson, ND 15 originally turned north briefly before turning back to the east to meet US 81.  Now the highway keeps going straight to its interchange with I-29 / US 81.

Major intersections

References

External links

The North Dakota Highways Page by Chris Geelhart
North Dakota Signs by Mark O'Neil

015